The Felton House, also known as Billy Place, is a historic residence in Marshallville, Georgia. It was added to the National Register of Historic Places on November 25, 1980. It is located on  Route 1.

William Felton established residence on the stage road from Lanier, Georgia to Perry, Georgia, 4 miles west of Winchester, Georgia. He married Matilda Rushin and then after her death her sister Matilda Rushin. He built the home that was also used as a stage coach stop and tavern.

The home was designed what is referred to as Plantation Plain architecture style and includes brick chimneys, a two-story Greek Revival architecture portico and 11 foot ceilings. Barns and sheds were also constructed on the property and cotton was grown on the property. A railroad line was constructed on land ceded from the property.

See also
National Register of Historic Places listings in Macon County, Georgia

References

Further reading
The Johnston-Felton House

External links
Discussion of home Ancestry.com

Buildings and structures in Macon County, Georgia
National Register of Historic Places in Macon County, Georgia